Zitilites  (pronounced as 'city-lights') is the fourth album by Kashmir. It was released in 2003. Henrik Lindstrand joined the band as a permanent member on this album. "Rocket Brothers", "Surfing the Warm Industry" and "The Aftermath" were all released as singles and were all hits in Denmark. "Rocket Brothers" especially was a huge hit in Denmark and Latin America.

Track listing

Kashmir (band) albums
2003 albums